Hugh Dyer (1 June 1930 – 16 April 1977) was a Guyanese cricketer. He played in three first-class matches for British Guiana from 1951 to 1954.

See also
 List of Guyanese representative cricketers

References

External links
 

1930 births
1977 deaths
Guyanese cricketers
Guyana cricketers